Wegneria lachanitis is a moth of the family Tineidae first described by Edward Meyrick in 1906. It is found in Sri Lanka and India.

The caterpillars use fungi as their host plants.

References

Moths of Asia
Moths described in 1906
Tineidae
Hieroxestinae